ISO  is the entry for Norway in ISO 3166-2, part of the ISO 3166 standard published by the International Organization for Standardization (ISO), which defines codes for the names of the principal subdivisions (e.g., provinces or states) of all countries coded in ISO 3166-1.

Currently, for Norway, ISO 3166-2 codes are defined for the following subdivisions:
 11 counties
 2 arctic regions (i.e., Svalbard and Jan Mayen, territories in the Arctic region separated from metropolitan Norway)

Each code consists of two parts, separated by a hyphen. The second part is two digits.

Collectively Svalbard and Jan Mayen is also assigned its own country code in ISO 3166-1, with alpha-2 code .

Current codes
Subdivision names are listed as in the ISO  standard published by the ISO 3166 Maintenance Agency (ISO 3166/MA).

Click on the button in the header to sort each column.  Note that subdivision names will be sorted in Norwegian alphabetical order: a-z, æ, ø, å.

Changes
The following changes to the entry have been announced by the ISO 3166/MA since the first publication of ISO 3166-2 in 1998.  ISO stopped issuing newsletters in 2013.

See also
 Subdivisions of Norway
 FIPS region codes of Norway
 NUTS codes of Norway

References

External links
 ISO Online Browsing Platform: NO
 Counties of Norway, Statoids.com

2:NO
ISO 3166-2
Norway geography-related lists